Gray's stone loach (Balitora brucei) is a species of ray-finned fish in the genus Balitora.  It is endemic to India, Bhutan, Bangladesh, Nepal and Myanmar.  It grows to a maximum length of 10.5 cm.

Footnotes 

 

Balitora
Fish described in 1830
Taxa named by John Edward Gray